Carsten Lömker (born 3 September 1964 in Dortmund) is a West German sprint canoer who competed in the late 1980s. He won a bronze medal in the K-4 10000 m event at the 1987 ICF Canoe Sprint World Championships in Duisburg.

Lömker also finished fourth in the K-2 1000 m event at the 1988 Summer Olympics in Seoul.

Carsten moved to Australia’s Gold Coast, in the early 90’s and coached elite kayakers, such as Nicholas Crilly, at the Australian Institute of Sport facility, at Pizzey Park.

References

Sports-reference.com profile

1964 births
Canoeists at the 1988 Summer Olympics
German male canoeists
Living people
Olympic canoeists of West Germany
Sportspeople from Dortmund
ICF Canoe Sprint World Championships medalists in kayak